56 (fifty-six) is the natural number following 55 and preceding 57.

Mathematics 

56 is:

 The sum of the first six triangular numbers (making it a tetrahedral number).
 The number of ways to choose 3 out of 8 objects or 5 out of 8 objects, if order does not matter.
 The sum of six consecutive primes (3 + 5 + 7 + 11 + 13 + 17)
 a tetranacci number and a pronic number.
 a refactorable number, since 8 is one of its 8 divisors.
 The sum of the sums of the divisors of the first 8 positive integers.
 A semiperfect number, since 56 is twice a perfect number.
 A partition number – the number of distinct ways 11 can be represented as the sum of natural numbers.
 An Erdős–Woods number, since it is possible to find sequences of 56 consecutive integers such that each inner member shares a factor with either the first or the last member.
 The only known number n such that , where φ(m) is Euler's totient function and σ(n) is the sum of the divisor function, see .
 The maximum determinant in an 8 by 8 matrix of zeroes and ones.
 The number of polygons formed by connecting all the 8 points on the perimeter of a two-times-two-square by straight lines.

Plutarch states that the Pythagoreans associated a polygon of 56 sides with Typhon and that they associated certain polygons of smaller numbers of sides with other figures in Greek mythology.  While it is impossible to construct a perfect regular 56-sided polygon using a compass and straightedge, a close approximation has recently been discovered which it is claimed might have been used at Stonehenge, and it is constructible if the use of an angle trisector is allowed since 56 = 23 × 7.

Science, technology, and biology 
 The atomic number of barium.
 In humans, olfactory receptors are categorized in 56 families.
 The maximum speed of analog data transmission over a POTS in the 20th century was 56 kbit/s.
 The number of bits in a key used in the Data Encryption Standard.

Astronomy 
 Messier object M56, a magnitude 9.5 globular cluster in the constellation Lyra
 The New General Catalogue object NGC 56, an unverified object in the constellation Pisces, which does not appear to be a real object

Music 
 "56 Minutes", a 2007 David Woodard composition for piano, violin, cello and electronics
 Flatfoot 56, a Christian punk rock band
 "Along For The Ride ('56 T-bird)" sung by Danny O'Keefe
 This song was covered by John Denver
 "Five Feet of Lovin '56" sung by Gene Vincent
 Elvis '56, an Elvis Presley CD
 The name of a Plexi song
 Xperimento56, a Spanish Funk/Rock band
 56 Nights, a mixtape by Future

Television and film 
 Nasser 56, a documentary

Sports
 Joe DiMaggio's 56-game hitting streak, which DiMaggio accomplished in 1941 with the New York Yankees. This remains a record today.
Hack Wilson hit 56 home runs in 1930, a National League record until 1998
56 people died in a fire at Valley Parade on May 11 in the Bradford City stadium fire.
The number of the laps of the Chinese Grand Prix, Malaysian Grand Prix, and United States Grand Prix since 2012, the first season in which the US race was held at the Circuit of the Americas.

Organizations 
 The symbol of the Hungarian Revolution of 1956.
 Brazilian politician, Enéas Carneiro has an odd way of repeating the number of his party, "Fifty-Six" (in Portuguese), making it a widely repeated jargon in his country.
 56 Stuff, an international art community and a record label.
 Department 56 designer of collectibles, giftware and seasonal decorations such as miniature village houses.

People 
 Shirley Temple, as a child, wore 56 curls in her hair. Curls were set by her mother, who thus made sure of the exact number.
 Isoroku Yamamoto, named "Isoroku" because his father's age was 56 at his birth, and "Isoroku" is an old Japanese term meaning 56.

Geography 
 The name of the town Fifty-Six, Arkansas.
 The number of counties in the state of Montana.
 In the Los Angeles postal district, Zone 56 (now the ZIP Code area 90056) is one of few that is not within the Los Angeles City Limits (90020 and 90044 are others).
 56 is the number of the French department Morbihan.
 There are 56 Longhurst codes.
 +56 is the code for international direct-dial phone calls to Chile.

Archaeology 
 The number of Aubrey Holes (thought to have located wooden posts) in the first stage of Stonehenge.

Cosmogony
 According to Aristotle, 56 is the number of layers of the Universe – Earth plus 55 crystalline spheres above it.

History
 The number of men who signed the United States Declaration of Independence in 1776.
 The number of men of Netophah at the census of men of Israel upon return from exile (Ezra 2:22).

Occultism
 There should be 56 cards in the Minor Arcana of a Tarot deck.

See also 
 List of highways numbered 56

References

Integers